The Monkey's Paw is a 1948 British horror film directed by Norman Lee and starring Milton Rosmer, Michael Martin Harvey, Joan Seton and Megs Jenkins. It is based on the 1902 story "The Monkey's Paw" by W. W. Jacobs. The screenplay was written by Norman Lee and Barbara Toy. It was produced by Ernest G. Roy.

Plot summary
A magic Monkey's Paw grants its owner three wishes before a disaster befalls them.

Cast
 Milton Rosmer as Mr. Trelawne 
 Megs Jenkins as Mrs. Trelawne 
 Michael Martin Harvey as Kelly 
 Eric Micklewood as Tom Trelawne 
 Brenda Hogan as Beryl 
 Mackenzie Ward as Noel Lang 
 Joan Seton as Dorothy Lang 
 Norman Shelley as Monoghan 
 Alfie Bass as Roberts, the Speedway Track Manager 
 Rose Howlett as Mrs. Gurney 
 Hay Petrie as Grimshaw 
 Sydney Tafler as The Dealer 
 Patrick Ward as Sergeant Lawson 
 Vincent Lawson as Morgan

Critical reception

The Spinning Image called it "a creaky diversion with stagey acting and an obvious lack of funds to open it out, yet the strength of Jacobs' yarn was such that it showed through even the most impoverished of tellings." On his website Fantastic Movie Musings and Ramblings, Dave Sindelar commended the film for its character development and climax which he called "suitably tense and eerie".

References

External links
 
 

1948 films
1948 horror films
British horror films
British black-and-white films
1940s English-language films
Films based on short fiction
Films based on works by W. W. Jacobs
Films directed by Norman Lee
Films produced by Ernest G. Roy
1940s British films